The Rhode Island Supreme Court is the court of last resort in the U.S. State of Rhode Island. The Court consists of a Chief Justice and four Associate Justices, all selected by the Governor of Rhode Island from candidates vetted by the Judicial Nominating Commission. Each justice enjoys lifetime tenure and no mandatory retirement age, similar to Federal judges. Justices may be removed only if impeached for improper conduct by a vote of the Rhode Island House of Representatives and convicted by trial in the Rhode Island Senate.

History
In 1747, the Rhode Island General Assembly authorized the creation of a Superior Court of Judicature, Court of Assize, and General Gaol Delivery, consisting of one chief justice and four associates, all serving one year terms. The 1747 enactment replaced an earlier appeals court of the same name, which had been composed of the governor or deputy governor and at least six of the elected "assistants," which dated to 1729 under the same name and the composition dated back to the 1663 charter when it was known as the "General Court of Trials." This court had replaced an even earlier court formed under the Charter of 1644, a 1647 enactment of a code of laws, and a 1651 amendment creating appellate jurisdiction.

Most of the judges during the 18th century were laymen, merchants or farmers and did not possess formal legal training, and therefore the court did not explicitly follow English common law. Parties, however, could still appeal to either the British monarch, English courts or the General Assembly until independence in 1776.

In 1747 the General Assembly appointed the first Chief Justice, Gideon Cornell, who was a judge, farmer, and merchant, and the second, Joshua Babcock, a Yale-educated physician. Stephen Hopkins, later signatory of the Declaration of Independence, served as the third Chief Justice from 1747 to 1755.

In 1798, the General Assembly renamed the Court the "Supreme Judicial Court," and in 1843, the "Supreme Court." The first officially recorded decision was Stoddard v. Martin, 1 R.I. 1 (1828), a case involving gambling on an election. Since 1930, the Court has been located within the Licht Judicial Complex at the base of College Hill in Providence, Rhode Island. Until 1994, the General Assembly sitting with both houses in "Grand Committee" chose the Supreme Court justices without the governor's consent. In 1994, after a wave of corruption scandals, citizens amended the Rhode Island Constitution to allow the governor to choose Supreme Court nominees from a list of candidates approved by a non-partisan nominating committee. Both houses of the General Assembly still must approve any nominees.

Current justices

Notable cases
Stoddard v. Martin (1828)  first case recorded in the official reports of the Rhode Island Supreme Court.
Trevett v. Weeden (1786), (involving the legitimacy of paper money) was one of the first cases where a state court held a legislative act unconstitutional, setting precedent for Marbury v. Madison.
Angel v. Murray, 113 R.I. 482, 322 A.2d 630 (1974), which was the first case to apply the UCC's reasoning on contract modification to service contracts. The rule states that a contract does not always need additional consideration for modification, provided certain conditions are present.
Picard v. Barry Pontiac-Buick, Inc., 654 A.2d 690 (R.I. 1995), a tort case, which is often used as an example of battery in tort textbooks.

Notable justices 

Peleg Arnold, Delegate to the Continental Congress
Joshua Babcock, physician, friend of Benjamin Franklin
Charles S. Bradley, former partner at Tillinghast & Bradley
William Ellery, Signatory of the Declaration of Independence
Stephen Hopkins, Signatory of the Declaration of Independence, Governor of Rhode Island
David Howell, Delegate to the Continental Congress, federalist leader, U.S. District Judge
Christopher Lippitt, American revolution officer under George Washington
Daniel Lyman, member of the secessionist Hartford Convention of 1814
Samuel Ward, Delegate to the Continental Congress, Governor
William West, 1787–1789, American Revolution general, Deputy Governor, anti-federalist rebellion leader

Chief justices 

A few noted Chief Justices of the Rhode Island Supreme Court include:
Joshua Babcock
Stephen Hopkins
Samuel Ward
John Gardner
Peleg Arnold
Daniel Lyman
Paul A. Suttell

Images

Footnotes

External links

 Rhode Island Supreme Court
Irving Berdine Richman,  Rhode Island: A Study in Separatism, (Boston: Houghton, Mifflin & Co., 1905), 191.
Thomas Durfee, Gleanings from the Judicial History of Rhode Island, (Providence: Sidney S. Rider, 1883), p. 164
Amasa M. Eaton, The Development of the Judicial System in Rhode Island, Yale Law Journal 14 (Jan. 1905), 148–170.
John T. Farrell, The Early History of Rhode Island’s Court System, Rhode Island History 9 (July 1950), 65–71; 9 (Oct. 1950), 103–117; 10 (Jan. 1951), 14–25
Link to article describing various RI Court primary sources
Gail I. Winson, "," (Roger Williams School of Law).
Map: 
Supreme Court Opinions from the Rhode Island State Archives
 

1747 establishments in Rhode Island
Rhode Island
Supreme
Courts and tribunals established in 1747
1841 establishments in Rhode Island
Courts and tribunals established in 1841